John Wyeth (1770–1858) was a printer in Harrisburg, Pennsylvania who is best-known for printing Wyeth's Repository of Sacred Music, Part Second (Harrisburg, PA: 1813), which marks an important transition in American music. Like the original Repository of 1810, Part Second used the four-shape system of Little and Smith in The Easy Instructor (Philadelphia, PA: 1801) to appeal to a wider audience; but its pioneering inclusion American folk tunes influenced all subsequent folk hymn, camp meeting, and shape note collections. Musicologist Warren Steel sees Wyeth's Repository of Sacred Music, Part Second as marking "the end of the age of New England composer-compilers (1770-1810) and the beginning of the age of southern collector-compilers (1816-1860)."

Biography
John Wyeth was born on March 31, 1770 in Cambridge, Massachusetts, the son of Ebenezer Wyeth, II, who fought at Bunker Hill, and Mary Wyeth, and the younger brother (by 12 years) of Joshua Wyeth who at the age of 16 participated in the Boston Tea Party. He learned printing through an apprenticeship. He worked as a printer in Santo Domingo. With the outbreak of the Haitian Revolution in 1791, he moved to Philadelphia, and finally settled in Harrisburg, Pennsylvania. In 1792 he became the publisher of a newspaper, The Oracle of Dauphin (Dauphin County). The following year he was appointed postmaster by George Washington, but in 1798 John Adams, who saw a conflict of interest in having a newspaper man also act as postmaster, dismissed him, although they were both Federalists. 

There is no record of Wyeth having any musical training or activity, but he discovered a market for tunebooks (with printed music) of sacred music at a time when "hymnal" referred to a book with words only. In 1810 when he published Joseph Doll's Der leichte Unterricht in der Vokal Musik for the German-speaking market, and Wyeth’s Repository of Sacred Music, for moderate evangelical Christians. In 1813 he published a Second Part of the Repository of Sacred Music, containing songs for Methodists and Baptists. In 1818 he published Choral Harmonie enthaltend Kirchen-Melodien for German Lutherans.

His wife was Louisa Wyeth (Weiss), together they had three children. His son Louis Wyeth (1812–1889) became a county judge of Marshall County, Alabama. After retiring, he moved to Philadelphia, where he died on January 23, 1858.

Wyeth's Repository of Sacred Music, Part Second
Although published in the north, Wyeth's Repository of Sacred Music, Part Second (1813), had a profound influence on Southern shape note tune-books. Of the 41 folk-hymns introduced here, 10 were used by Ananias Davisson in the Kentucky Harmony (1816), 20 by William Walker in the Southern Harmony (1835), and six in the Sacred Harp (1844). The tune, now known as "Nettleton," with the words "Come Thou Font Of Every Blessing" first appears here on page 112 in two parts (tenor and bass); it is now used in 397 hymnals.

One element of Part Second, the appearance of English hymnody, such as the ten tunes attributed to Martin Madan, was part of an on-going trend in the northern states, but ignored by Southern tunebook compilers, who increasingly turned to regional folk tunes as sources of inspiration.

Lack of musical training
John Wyeth describes his musical qualifications in the last sentence of the Preface to the first part of the Repository:
In short, if many years attention to the charms of church music, if an extensive acquaintance with the taste of teachers of the first emininence in the United States, and with the possession of some thousand pages of selected music to cull from, be considerations, which may added to the merit of the editor's undertaking...Wyeth does not claim any musical training or attendance at one of the singing schools typical of the time; he limits himself to (1) liking church music; (2) knowing the "taste" of teachers (but not studying under them), and (3) owning a collection of books from which to cull. Musicologist Irving Lowens suggests that his motivations may have been strictly business. Ross Ellison mentions the shrewdness in discovering a newly emerging musical market (revival music and camp meeting songs) as the significance of Wyeth's his contribution to American music. Warren Steel qualifies this assessment by drawing attention to the fact that Wyeth grew up in the Boston-Cambridge area at a time when singing-schools were popular, and when William Billings and others were creating American choral music.  The lack of musical skills did not matter for the original Repository, in which Wyeth merely reprinted material from earlier, successful publications. The innovative aspects of Part Second are attributed Elkanah Kelsey Dare, who was hired as music-editor, and contributed 16 of his own compositions (his entire known work). Dare may have been assisted by others, but their names have not been recorded.

Publications

References

External links
 John Wyeth page on ChoralWiki
 Scan of Wyeth's Repository, Part Second at the Petrucci Music Library

1770 births
1858 deaths
People from Harrisburg, Pennsylvania
1813 in music
Music publishers (people)
Hymnal editors